Llevant (Catalan for "East") is a comarca on the east side of the Balearic island of Majorca. It includes the municipalities of Artà, Capdepera, Manacor, Santa Margalida, Son Servera and Sant Llorenç des Cardassar.

Geography of Mallorca